Lebas is a French surname. Notable people with the surname include:

Alain Lebas (born 1953), French sprint canoeist
Jean-Baptiste Lebas (1898–1944), French politician
Louis-Hippolyte Lebas (1782–1867), French architect
Philippe-François-Joseph Le Bas (1762–1794) politician of the French Revolution

French-language surnames